Dráchov is a municipality and village in Tábor District in the South Bohemian Region of the Czech Republic. It has about 200 inhabitants.

Notable people
Jan Mládek (born 1960), economist and politician; lives here

References

Villages in Tábor District